Kasumigaseki Station is the name of two train stations in Japan.

 Kasumigaseki Station (Saitama) in Kawagoe, Saitama Prefecture.
 Kasumigaseki Station (Tokyo) in Tokyo.